Investors Mutual Limited (IML) is an Australian asset management limited company, established by Anton Tagliaferro in May 1998. The firm specializes in Australian equities and serves both retail and institutional investors through a conservative value-based investment style with a long-term perspective. As at December 2019, the company had over $9 billion in funds under management and its flagship and largest fund is the $2.6 billion IML Australian Share Fund.

History

In October 2017, Natixis Global Asset Management acquired 50% of IML.

Funds

In June 1998, IML launched the Australian Share Fund.

In December 1999, IML formed a partnership with a subsidiary of Bendigo Bank, Sandhurst Trustees Limited:

On 22 August 2014, IML established QV Equities Limited  ASX code: QVE), a listed investment company.

References

Financial services companies based in Sydney
Financial services companies established in 1998
Australian companies established in 1998
Investment companies of Australia
Private equity firms of Australia
Holding companies of Australia
Privately held companies of Australia